3-ketosteroid 9alpha-monooxygenase (KshAB, 3-ketosteroid 9alpha-hydroxylase) is an enzyme with systematic name androsta-1,4-diene-3,17-dione,NADH:oxygen oxidoreductase (9alpha-hydroxylating). This enzyme catalyses the following chemical reaction

 androsta-1,4-diene-3,17-dione + NADH + H+ + O2  9alpha-hydroxyandrosta-1,4-diene-3,17-dione + NAD+ + H2O

3-Ketosteroid 9alpha-monooxygenase is involved in the cholesterol degradation in several bacterial pathogens.

References

External links 
 

EC 1.14.13